Nicolás Nogueras Cartagena (July 5, 1935 – September 28, 2019) was a Puerto Rican politician, commentator and Senator. He was a member of the Senate of Puerto Rico for two separate periods of time. First from 1973 to 1985, and then from 1992 to 1996.

Biography

Nicolás Nogueras was born on July 5, 1935, in Cayey, Puerto Rico. He received his law degree from the University of Puerto Rico School of Law in 1959.

Nogueras began his political career with the Republican Party, but then joined the New Progressive Party (PNP). In 1972, he was elected to the Senate of Puerto Rico for the first time. He was reelected in 1976 and 1980. He served as Majority Speaker of the House of Representatives  from 1977 to 1980.

In 1978, Nogueras tried to obtain a writ of certiorari against Puerto Rican airline Prinair at the United States Supreme Court, but he was denied.

Nogueras retired from politics in 1985, but returned in 1988 when he was again reelected as Senator at the general elections. He was reelected in 1992 and was chosen as President pro tempore of the Senate.

In 1996, Nogueras was expelled from the Senate when House Speaker Zaida Hernández accused him of tax evasion. After several years, the accusations against Nogueras weren't proved and he was acquitted.

Aside from politics, Nogueras worked as a hotel and real estate owner. He also worked in the music and entertainment business as director of the César Concepción Orchestra, as a political commentator in various television and radio programs and as a private attorney. In 2011, he briefly represented PNP legislator Iván Rodríguez Traverzo in a case against him.

Nogueras was married to Lizbeth Algarín.

See also

List of Puerto Ricans
Senate of Puerto Rico

References

|-

External links
Biografía Nicolás Nogueras on SenadoPR

1935 births
Members of the Senate of Puerto Rico
New Progressive Party (Puerto Rico) politicians
People from Cayey, Puerto Rico
Presidents pro tempore of the Senate of Puerto Rico
Republican Party (Puerto Rico) politicians
2019 deaths